Cabatuan, officially the Municipality of Cabatuan,  is a 2nd class municipality in the province of Iloilo, Philippines. According to the 2020 census, it has a population of 61,110 people.

Certain crops are abundantly produced including rice, corn, sweet potato, taro, and cassava. Sugar cane, coffee, tropical fruits and vegetables, and coconut are also produced in certain areas. Cabatuananons also earn from livestock and poultry. Moreover, the land is also an excellent source of gravel and sand for the production of concrete

The new Iloilo International Airport is located in Cabatuan; specifically in Barangay Tabucan, Barangay Tiring, Barangay Duyan-Duyan and Barangay Manguna, all in Cabatuan. The airport can be reached either from the Cabatuan access roads (Barangay Tabucan and Barangay Tiring, Cabatuan) or from the Pavia-Santa Barbara-Cabatuan (Barangay Duyan-Duyan, Cabatuan) access road.

Cabatuan is a part of the Metro Iloilo–Guimaras area, centered on Iloilo City.

History
Towns people believed that Cabatuan could have gotten its name from three words in the local dialect describing certain facets of prehistoric Cabatuan. The name might have evolved from (1) CaBatuan which means a large area of rocks (2) Batuan which means to fight, defy, or oppose, and (3) Batu-an a sour-fruit-bearing evergreen tree that grew abundantly in the region. Another theory, however, suggests that the name was derived from "naga-batu" (fighting or opposing) which is used to describe a creek in the town that flowed from east to west opposite to that of the usual flows of the rivers in the region.

The town of Cabatuan was first noted for the "Sinulugans" or hillside tribesmen who annually practice the art of "Sinulog" or Dance of Death characterized by sword fighting rituals. "Tulisanes" and Rustlers also inhabit the place before the Spaniards came in 1732.

The town was founded on April 9, 1732, after a molave cross (with only its base currently existing) was planted on the peak of Pamul-ogan Hill. It was originally planned by Tono whose statue now stands in front of the Municipal Building. He was then a town leader together with two other leaders Gomoc and Amihan.  This early settlement was then flourishing on a level zone of land near the northern bank of the Tigum River where the poblacion or the commercial center of the town is now located.

In 1733, Cabatuan was officially organized upon the installation of Rev. Fr. Antonio Lopez as its first priest and Tono as its first "gobernadorcillo". Furthermore, the town was placed by the priest under the spiritual protection of Saint Nicholas de Tolentino whom Cabatuananons venerate as their Patron Saint whose feast is celebrated from September 1–10 every year through a 10-day celebration that is grandiosely culminated on September 10 by the highly anticipated Tinuom Festival patterned from Iloilo's Kasadyahan Festival.

In 1903, after the census had been taken, the neighbouring town of Maasin, with a population of 8401, was temporarily annexed to Cabatuan that had a population of 16,497.

During the Second World War, Cabatuan officially became the last defense of Western Visayas against the Japanese forces which led to the destruction of most of its edifices.

Lt. Col. Ryoichi Tozuka, the commander of the Imperial Japanese Army in Panay Island, signed the document of surrender at Cabatuan Airfield located in Cabatuan, Iloilo, Panay Island, Philippines, on September 2, 1945, the same day as the surrender signing in Japan aboard the U.S.S. Missouri. This was accepted by Col. Raymond G. Stanton, comdg the 160th U.S. Infantry regiment, and was attended by Rear Admiral Ralph O. Davis, comdg the U.S. Navy's 13th Amphibious Group, and by Brig. Gen. Donald J. Myers, comdg the 40th Infantry Division. The 13th Amphibious Group was tasked to transport the 40th U.S. Infantry Division to Korea.

Geography
Cabatuan is described as a cultural and religious town in the heart of Panay Island, located along a branch of the Suage River,  from Iloilo City, the capital of Iloilo province.

Barangays

Cabatuan is politically subdivided into 68 barangays, 11 of it are poblacion barangays.

Climate

Demographics

Kinaray-a is the most dominant language used by the residents but Hiligaynon, English, and Tagalog are also spoken. Roman Catholicism is the most dominant religion in this municipality.

Economy

Historical landmarks

San Nicholas de Tolentino Church
Built in 1834, San Nicholas de Tolentino Parish Church is a Tuscanic church of baked brick is one of the most beautiful churches in the Philippines. The gigantic Church is the only existing church in Iloilo which has three façades. Its twin belfries capped with cream-colored domes are considered to be one of the best in the Philippines.

The church was given the title "Model of Temples" since it was the best representation of European architecture on the Philippine islands during the Spanish era. In 1948, the church was partially damaged by an earthquake which ruined four of its belfries, two of its façade pediments and the central dome. In the early 1990s the church was restored back to its present grandeur. Today, 'La Iglesia de San Nicolas de Tolentino' is one of the most picturesque churches in Asia.

Cabatuan Cemetery
This century old Spanish-Filipino Cemetery is the only cemetery in the Philippines which is a perfect square. Three Byzantine arch entrances dominate the front-gate, while a baroque central chapel is located at the center. The chapel is a fusion of Roman, Gothic, Byzantine, and Baroque architectures. The complex carvings on the chapel's facade is considered to be the most distinct cemetery relief which can only be found in Cabatuan. Furthermore, this cemetery's neatness and organization is famous throughout the region.

The Town Hall
One of the earliest town halls built in Northern Iloilo is the Cabatuan Municipal Hall. It was built in 1734 along with the Church. Calamities and war, however, damaged the second level of this public house and many renovations had been done. On the other hand, the designs were still derived from the original plan of the Casa. The first level of the town hall is already centuries old and its interior is characterized by the art deco cubical columns and semi-arched tuscan windows adorned with capiz shells.

Pamul-ogan Hill
This shrine is considered to be the cradle of Cabatuan's History. At the peak of the hill lies a concrete cross reminiscent of the original cross planted by the Spaniards who first came in the region. Every lent, traditional devotees start their journey from the mouth of Barangay Pamulogan to the peak of the hill as penitence.

Baluarte Shrine
This picturesque shrine located in Balic Hill, is one of the places in Cabatuan that attract many tourists and pilgrims during lenten season. On the peak is a cross, a replica of the one in Pamul-ogan Hill, and on the foot of the hill lies an art-deco chapel. The view at the cross offers an astounding view of the whole town.

The Tree of Bondage
The Shrine of the Bondage Tree lies in the Town plaza directly in front of the Municipal Hall of Cabatuan. It is believed that the natives were tied in this tree and whipped if they refuse the polo or forced labor during the Spanish Era. The tree is an old and artistically skewed Plumeria tree (Plumeria rubra) currently fortified with a concrete base to withstand destruction.

Festivals and Events
The town celebrates three main holidays: the Cabatuan Town Fiesta on September 10, as well as the Tinuom Festival that culminates the town fiesta and the strictly observed Lenten procession during Holy Week.

Tinuom Festival
The Tinuom Festival is a celebration of the town's history and its popularly craved delicacy, tinuom made of native chicken souped with spices - tomatoes, onions, garlic, ginger, and lemon grass and wrapped in banana leaves. This festival is one of the highlights of the 10-day fiesta celebration of the municipality and is a colorful explosion of music and dances patterned from Iloilo's Kasadyahan Festival.  There are six (6) competing groups (called tribes or "tribu" in the local dialect) composed of students from six secondary schools in Cabatuan. The groups are judged according to creativity, originality, costume, and choreography, among others. The winning group is the town's official representative to the Kasadyahan Festival in Iloilo City where the town has been actively participating in. This year, Tribu Ilahas from Tiring National High School, winner of the 2007 Tinuom Festival placed third in the Kasadayahan Competition.

Holy Week
Cabatuan is also known to have the most wooden and porcelain statues being showcased on Lenten processions (a religious parade evident in almost all parishes in the Philippines during Holy Week). The most popular set of these figures is the wooden Last Supper.

In the morning of Good Friday, the statue of the Nazareno together with thousands of Cabatuananons and tourists alike follow a procession locally called Via Crucis from the Church to the Balic Hill pausing on the 14 Stations of the Cross erected along the path.

In the afternoon, on the other hand, another procession is held after the Good Friday Mass around the poblacion where the said wooden and porcelain statues embellished with fresh flowers, royal cloths and personalized lighting are paraded. They pass by the Stations of the Cross creatively displayed along in life-size carvings and effigies locally called Kapiya built out of indigenous materials native to the barangays assigned to the specific station. This unique display garnered recognition in Western Visayas and consequently haul tourists as well. Pasyon Singing by barangay folks accompanying their respective Kapiya follows the procession.

Lastly, the Dampug culminates the Holy Week. It is the reenactment of the angel's proclamation of Christ's resurrection and his meeting with Mary. Every year, a child of an illustrious family in town is held as "Dampug" or the proclaiming angel and a flamboyant stage, usually with cavern motif, is erected in the town plaza to serve as backdrop for the early dawn presentation. It is still very much respected by the townspeople today.

Facilities and services

Health Services

Rural Health Center
Located at San Agustin Street right behind the plaza's covered courts, the Cabatuan Rural Health Center is the most accessible rural health center in the municipality. It caters to treatment of minor diseases and injury, vaccination, and limited laboratory testing.

Ramon Tabiana Memorial District Hospital
The Ramon Tabiana Memorial District Hospital (RTMDH) located in Barangay Pungtod, Cabatuan is the major health service institution that serves the municipality and its neighboring towns. The hospital is headed by Dr. Levi Osea, has a 50-bed capacity, and is served by 76 personnel. During the 4th Hospital Awards and Recognition Ceremony held on April 10, 2008, at the Iloilo Provincial Capitol, RTMDH was adjudged the Best District Hospital in the province of Iloilo and bagged five awards - Best Hospital, Best in Dental Service, Best in Laboratory Service, Best in Dietary Service, Best in Radiology Service and Best in Administrative Service.

Cabatuan Fire Station
The Cabatuan Fire Station was chosen as entry of Region VI in the Search for Outstanding Municipal Fire Station in the Philippines in 2008.

Education
Forty-six educational institutions, including day care centers, can be found in Cabatuan.  Of this total, 44 are public schools while two are private institutions, which are also accredited by the Department of Education (DepEd) and the Bureau of Secondary Education.

The municipality has six public secondary schools. The main high school located in the poblacion is the Cabatuan National Comprehensive High School. The five others are Tiring National high School, Wenceslao Grio National High School, Acao National High School, Mateo National High School and Ambrosio Maido Memorial National High School.

On the other hand, 38 public elementary schools can be found in the municipality. Twenty-nine elementary schools offer complete courses in elementary education while 9 schools only offer primary grades (Grade 1 to 4).  Divided into districts, the public elementary schools in Cabatuan are almost evenly distributed among the barangays.  The first district has 18 public elementary schools while the second district has 20. The 38 public elementary schools' names are enumerated below.

District I
 Cabatuan Central Elementary School
 Celda Elementary School
 Cipriano Clama Primary School
 Colomer Elementary School
 D.N. Catalan Mem. Elementary School
 Inaladan Primary School
 Janipaan Elementary School
 Jelicuon Elementary School
 Jiloca Elementary School
 Maraguit Elementary School
 Martin Cubil Elementary School
 Moises Cuello Primary School
 P. Muyuela Elementary School
 Puga Elementary School
 Tabares Elementary School
 Tigbauan Road Elementary School
 V. Deseda Primary School
 W. Grio Elementary School

District II
  Apia Elementary School
  Bacan Elementary School
  Doroteo Lujan Elementary School
  Gaub Elementary School
  Guibuangan Elementary School
  Ito Elementary School
  Inaca Elementary School
  Mateo Elementary School
  Morobuan Primary School
 Marin Elementary School
 Parreño Elementary School
 Pungtod Elementary School
 C. Galindo Primary School
 Salacay Elementary School
 E.J. Hobilla Memorial Elementary School
 T. Confesor Mem. Elementary School
 Tiring Central Elementary School
 Tupol Elementary School
 J.B. Pueyo Primary School
 Pamuringao Primary School

Two other private institutions offering complete elementary education can be found in the municipality. One is the parish-owned Cabatuan Parochial School at Rizal Ilaya Street and the other is Clairemont International Grade School at Serrano Ext. Street right beside the Cabatuan National Comprehensive High School.

Cabatuan Hymn
The town has its own official hymn entitled Ang Banwa nga Namat-an composed by Jesus Pablito G. Villanueva. It is required (as imposed by Municipal Ordinance No. 2007-002) that the hymn be sung after the National Anthem in flag ceremonies in all public schools, agencies, and institutions in Cabatuan.

References

External links

 [ Philippine Standard Geographic Code]
 Philippine Census Information
 Local Governance Performance Management System

Municipalities of Iloilo